The poliudie was the practice of gathering tribute by the rulers of Kievan Rus' from vassal East Slavic and Finnic tribes. It was similar to the "right of hospitality" as practised in the Viking lands (where it was known as veizla) and early medieval Poland (where it was known as stan).

The poliudie (Greek: πολύδια) was described in De Administrando Imperio by the Byzantine emperor Constantine Porphyrogenitus. In winter, the ruler of Kiev went out on rounds, visiting Dregovichs, Krivichs, Drevlians, Severians, and other subordinated tribes. Some paid tribute in money, some in furs or other commodities, and some in slaves. In April, the prince returned to Kiev.

The Primary Chronicle suggests Olga of Kiev changed the method of gathering tribute. The chronicle reports that Olga's husband, Igor, was killed by the Drevlians angered at his attempt to collect more tribute than it had been agreed. After his death, Olga appointed her own officials to gather and deliver tribute, at least in some of the areas of her domain, preferring not to rely on local chiefs and the system of poliudie. Valentin Yanin suggests that Olga's reform was the first germ of the Rus' law, later codified as the Russkaya Pravda.

Notes

References
Jones, Gwyn (2001). A History of the Vikings. Oxford University Press.  
Martin, Janet (1995). Medieval Russia, 980-1584. Cambridge University Press. 

History of Kievan Rus'
History of taxation